Canarium merrillii is a tree in the family Burseraceae. It is named for the American botanist Elmer Drew Merrill.

Description
The bark is grey and scaly. The flowers are yellow.

Distribution and habitat
Canarium merrillii is endemic to Borneo. Its habitat is mixed dipterocarp to submontane forests from sea-level to  altitude.

References

merrillii
Endemic flora of Borneo
Trees of Borneo
Plants described in 1929